The Antioch Christian Church in Winchester, Kentucky is a historic church.  It was built in 1834 and added to the National Register in 1979.

It was built as a stone, one-story, two-entrance church.  It was later converted to a barn with a gambrel roof.

References

See also
National Register of Historic Places listings in Kentucky

Churches on the National Register of Historic Places in Kentucky
Churches completed in 1834
19th-century churches in the United States
Churches in Clark County, Kentucky
National Register of Historic Places in Clark County, Kentucky
1834 establishments in Kentucky
Winchester, Kentucky